List of Fiat V.I. models from 1903 to 1975, after 1975 see Iveco.

Commercial and military vehicles

Old military & civilian Fiat trucks 
 Fiat 24HP (1903)
 Fiat 18/24 llHP (1906)
 Fiat Tipo 1 - 12/15 HP (1907)
 Fiat Tipo 2 (1911)
 Fiat 15 (1911)
 Fiat 18 (1911)
 Fiat 20 (1915)
 AMO F-15 (1924)

Civilian Fiat trucks 
 Fiat 502F (1923)
 Fiat 505F (1923)
 Fiat 603 (1925)
 Fiat 503F (1926)
 Fiat 605 (1926)
 Fiat 507F (1927)
 Fiat 621 (1929)
 Fiat 614 (1930)
 Fiat 632 (1931)
 Fiat 634 (1931)
 Fiat 618 (1934)
 Fiat 666 (1939)
 Fiat 626 (1939)
 Fiat 615 (1931)
 Fiat 639N (1950)
 Fiat 642 (1952)
 Fiat 682 (1952)
 Fiat C40 (1958)
 Fiat C50 (1959)
 Fiat 645 N (1959)
 Fiat 6602 (1960)
 Fiat 6605 TM69 (1962)
 Fiat 643 N (1963)
 Fiat 6640
 Fiat 616 N (1965)
 Fiat 625 N (1965)
 Fiat 619 N/T (1969)
 Fiat 673 N/T (1969)
 Fiat 697 N/T (1971)
 Fiat 40 NC (1972)
 Fiat 170/190 (1975)

Military Fiat trucks 
 Fiat 18 BL (1914)
 Fiat 611C (1929)
 Fiat 634 N (1931)
 Fiat-SPA Dovunque 33 (1931)
 Fiat-SPA 36R (1933)
 Fiat 633NM (1933)
 Fiat 621PN (1934)
 Fiat-SPA Dovunque 35 (1935)
 Polski Fiat 621L (1935)
 Fiat 618MC (1935)
 Fiat-SPA 38R (1936)
 Fiat-SPA TL 37 (1937)
 Polski Fiat 618 (1937)
 Fiat 626 NM (1939)
 Fiat 626 BM (1941)
 Fiat 665 NM (1942)
 Fiat-SPA Dovunque 41 (1943)
 Fiat-SPA 10.000 (1945)
 Fiat 680 CP48 (1949)
 Fiat 639 CM (1950)
 Fiat 645 NM (1959)
 Fiat CP 62/70 (1962)
 Fiat 693 N1Z (1966)

Public transport vehicles

Fiat buses 
 Fiat 24HP (1903)
 Fiat 18/24 HP (1906)
 Fiat Tipo 2F (1911)
 Fiat 15 (1911)
 Fiat 18 (1911)
 AMO F-15 (1924)
 Fiat 603S (1925)
 Fiat 605 (1926)
 Fiat 635 R (1931)
 Fiat 632 RN (1933)
 Fiat 656 RN (1935)
 Fiat 666 RN (1935)
 Fiat 635 RN (1936)
 Fiat 626 NLR (1939)
 Fiat 642 (1950)
 Fiat 668 F (1950)
 Fiat 680 RN (1950)
 Fiat 401 (1953)
 Fiat 404 (1955)
 Fiat 411 (1955)
 Fiat 405 (1958)
 Fiat 306 (1956)
 Fiat 410 (1960)
 Fiat 414 (1960)
 Fiat 314 (1961)
 Fiat 412 (1961)
 Fiat 413 (1961)
 Fiat 409 (1963)
 Fiat 625 (1965)
 Fiat 320 (1967)
 Fiat 416 (1968)
 Fiat 343 (1970)
 Fiat 308 (1971)
 Fiat 418 (1971)
 Fiat 421 (1973)
 Fiat 420 (1975)
 Fiat-Iveco 370 (1976)
 Fiat-Iveco 315 (1978)
 Fiat-Iveco 470 (1979)
 Fiat-Iveco 570 (1979)
 Fiat-Iveco 670 (1979)
 Iveco EuroClass (1993)

Fiat trolleybuses 
 Fiat 635 F (1932)
 Fiat 656 F (1936)
 Fiat 672 F (1940)
 Fiat 668 F (1950)
 Fiat 2401 Cansa (1953)
 Fiat 2405 (1955)
 Fiat 2411 (1955)
 Fiat 2472 Viberti (1958)
 Fiat 2470 (1979)

References
 Camion Fiat  by Massimo Condolo
 100 Anni di Camion Fiat - Negri Editore

Fiat
Fiat V.I.
Fiat trucks